Frick Park is the largest municipal park in Pittsburgh, Pennsylvania, United States, covering . It is one of Pittsburgh's four historic large parks.

History
He also arranged for a $2 million trust fund ($ million today) for long-term maintenance for the park, which opened on June 25, 1927. He did this against his will, but rather acquiesced to his daughter  Helen's debutante wish which he had promised to honor. 

Henry Clay Frick's son, Childs Frick, developed his lifelong love of animals in the woods and ravines of the park. Childs Frick went on to be a renowned American vertebrate paleontologist, major benefactor and trustee of the American Museum of Natural History.

Over the years, the park grew from the original land in Point Breeze and now includes Squirrel Hill to the border of Edgewood. In a city that Frick helped to industrialize, it is one of the few areas of steep ravines and mature woods that remain relatively undisturbed, forming a nature reserve of native plants and abundant wildlife. Owls, amphibians, wild turkey, fox, and many mammal species are found in the park.

On January 28, 2022, the Fern Hollow Bridge, a steel rigid-frame bridge carrying Forbes Avenue across the park at Hot Dog Dam Dog Park collapsed, injuring 10. The remains of the bridge landed on and blocked a recreational trail.

Characteristics and facilities

Frick Environmental Center
The original Frick Environmental Center, completed in 1979, originally housed the City's Environmental Education Program and for many years hosted ecological and other programs related to the park. A fire in 2002 rendered the building functionally unusable. Demolition at the site was completed and construction began in late-2014.

The current, 15,500-square-foot Frick Environmental Center opened to the public in 2016, following a $16 million construction project. The site includes indoor and outdoor classrooms, public restrooms, and other facilities, and has various energy-efficient and green features, include a photovoltaic array and geothermal bore field. The center was certified as LEED Platinium the next year. The Pittsburgh Parks Conservancy operates the center in collaboration with the City of Pittsburgh.

Ecology
The eastern park boundary is Nine Mile Run, a formerly heavily polluted stream which was restored between 2003 and 2006. The addition of 2.2 miles of Nine Mile Run extended Frick Park nearly to the Monongahela River.

Restoration efforts in 2017-18 involved the removal of about 2.6 acres of bush honeysuckle, an invasive plant that had affected the park for some 20 years, displacing native plants. Following the clearance of the honeysuckle, the Pittsburgh Parks Conservancy discovered ten healthy butternut trees. This was a significant discovery since every other tree in the park is thought to be affected by butternut canker, a fungal disease lethal to plants.

Recreational uses
The park includes a playground, known as the Blue Slide playground, and a dog park. An annual Shakespeare in the Park performance occurs in the upper portion of the park.

Sledding on this hill in Frick Park, along Beechwood Boulevard near Nicholson Street, is a popular winter pastime for some local residents. The hill's long, sloping bowl ends in a grouping of trees. Two different approaches down the hill – one shallow and one steep – intersect at the bottom, occasionally resulting in collisions between sledders. Crashing into trees is also an occasional occurrence. As a result, in 2010 the city posted "no sledding" signs for liability reasons.

In popular culture
Pittsburgh rapper Mac Miller's 2011 album Blue Slide Park is named after the park playground. His song "Frick Park Market" is likewise named for a small store near the Point Breeze park boundary. Following Miller's death on September 7, 2018, the park has been a site for vigils in his memory. The park has been renamed "The Blue Slide of Mac Miller" on Google Maps and "Mac Miller's Blue Slide Playground" on Apple Maps.

References

External links

 Pittsburgh Parks Conservancy
 Frick Environmental Center website
 Pittsburgh Dept. of Parks & Recreation website
 Frick Park Clay Court Tennis Club history

Parks in Pittsburgh
Urban forests in the United States
Urban public parks
Nature centers in Pennsylvania
National Register of Historic Places in Pittsburgh
Parks on the National Register of Historic Places in Pennsylvania